Bluebeard's 8th Wife (alternately Bluebeard's Eighth Wife) is a 1923 American silent romantic comedy film produced by Famous Players-Lasky and distributed by Paramount Pictures. It was directed by Sam Wood and stars Gloria Swanson. The film is based on the French play La huitième femme de Barbe-Bleue by Alfred Savoir which is based on the Bluebeard tales of the 15th century. The play ran on Broadway in 1921 starring Ina Claire in the Swanson role.

Paramount remade the story in 1938 directed by Ernst Lubitsch and starring Gary Cooper and Claudette Colbert.

Plot
As described in Exhibitors Trade Review, Mona marries John Brandon and immediately after discovers that she is his eighth wife. Determined that she will not be the eighth to be divorced from him, she sets out on a teaser campaign which proves very effective until Brandon tells her that she is bought and paid for. Furious, she determines to give him grounds for a divorce and is subsequently found in her room with another man. In the end, however, Brandon discovers that she really loves him and they leave for a happy honeymoon.

Cast

Preservation
As no prints of Bluebeard's 8th Wife have been located in any film archives, it is a lost film.

Further reading

External images
Lobby poster
huntley-gordon-and-gloria-swanson-1923-bluebeards-eighth-wife at gettyimages.com
Lobby card and still at Glorious Gloria Swanson

References

External links

1923 films
1923 romantic comedy films
American romantic comedy films
American silent feature films
American black-and-white films
American films based on plays
Films directed by Sam Wood
Famous Players-Lasky films
Paramount Pictures films
Lost American films
1923 lost films
1920s American films
Silent romantic comedy films
Silent American comedy films
Films based on Bluebeard
1920s English-language films